Eurotettix similraphael is a grasshopper species in the family Acrididae.   It was described by Maria Marta Cigliano in 2007. It is known only from the type locality in the state of Goias, Brazil.

References

Acrididae
Endemic fauna of Brazil
Insects described in 2007